Dassault is a French surname.

List of people with the surname 

 Darius Paul Dassault (1882–1969), French general
 Laurent Dassault (born 1953), French billionaire businessman
 Marcel Dassault (1892–1986), French engineer and industrialist
 Olivier Dassault (1951–2021), French politician and billionaire businessman
 Serge Dassault (1925–2018), French engineer, businessman and politician
 Thierry Dassault (born 1957), French billionaire businessman
 Victor Habert-Dassault (born 1992), French politician

See also 

 Dassault Group

Surnames
Surnames of French origin
French-language surnames